Pyracantha koidzumii commonly known as Formosa firethorn or Taiwan firethorn, is a species of plant in the family Rosaceae. It is threatened by habitat loss.

Description and distribution
However, it has been introduced to such US states as Alabama, Arkansas, Georgia, Florida and South Carolina.

References

Endemic flora of Taiwan
koidzumii
Endangered plants
Taxonomy articles created by Polbot